Mixbook is an Internet-based photo design tool and photo product service based in Redwood City, California. Mixbook's service allows customers to design customized photo books, cards, calendars, canvas prints and photo prints through its online interface. Mixbook derives its revenues by printing customized photo products and shipping it to customers.

History 
Mixbook was founded by Andrew Laffoon and Aryk Grosz,  while attending The University of California, Berkeley.  

The company initially created a solution to help high school groups and students create their own yearbooks. It launched its photo book editor tool in 2009 providing consumers with a way to create fully customizable photo books . In 2010, Mixbook added calendars and photo cards to its product line.

Along with the acquisition of Scrapblog in 2011, the firm  grew four times in revenue and raised $10M from Level Equity.

In 2012, Mixbook released new features to their photo book editor tool which allowed user customization with Instagram. It also released a photo book app called Mosaic which allows users to build a     book with photos found on their mobile device.

In 2013, the firm launched another photo book service called Montage, which offers a web-based interface, powered by image recognition technolog.

Mixbook was named "one of the best photo book making sites" by CNET. Washington Post described Mixbook as “offering the ‘most customizable’ templates, fonts, and software—and also for options that meet any budget.”

In 2015, Mixbook launched two new product lines for photo prints and canvas prints. Montage and Mosaic were featured on The Today Show, where Mosaic was highlighted as a favorite gift of the season.

Awards and Accolades 
 #43, America's Most Promising Companies, Forbes
 #176 on Inc 500, Inc Magazine
 "Second fastest growing company in Silicon Valley", Silicon Valley Business Journal

List of Acquisitions 
 WedPics, acquired by Mixbook in 2017.
 Scrapblog, acquired by Mixbook in 2011 - Scrapblog had raised $11.5M from Steamboat Ventures and Longworth Venture Partners, Disney's venture capital arm 
 Citrify, acquired by Mixbook
 Yobongo, acquired by Mixbook in 2012 - Yobongo had raised $1.35 million from True Ventures, Freestyle Capital, Mitch Kapor and others. The Yobongo team helped develop Mixbook's mobile app, Mosaic.

References 

Photo software
2006 establishments in California
Companies based in Palo Alto, California